The 1936 Australia rugby union tour of New Zealand was a series of rugby union matches undertaken by the Australia team in New Zealand against invitational and national teams of New Zealand.

The most important matches were the two test matches against New Zealand - The "All Blacks" won both and regained the Bledisloe Cup lost during the 1934 tour in Australia

Matches 
Scores and results list Australia's points tally first.

Sources

Australia national rugby union team tours of New Zealand
Australia Rugby Union
New Zealand Rugby Union